Ansonia penangensis is a species of toad in the family Bufonidae. It is endemic to Penang Island, Malaysia. Records from elsewhere represent other species; the mainland records are referable to Ansonia malayana and Ansonia jeetsukumarani.

Its natural habitats are rocky streams in rainforests.

References

External links
 Amphibian and Reptiles of Peninsular Malaysia - Ansonia penangensis

penangensis
Endemic fauna of Malaysia
Amphibians of Malaysia
Amphibians described in 1870
Taxa named by Ferdinand Stoliczka
Taxonomy articles created by Polbot